The 1976 Six Hours of Silverstone was the third race of the 1976 World Championship for Makes. It took place at the Silverstone Circuit, Great Britain on  9 May 1976. It was open to Group 5 Special Production cars, Group 4 GT cars and Group 2 Touring Cars.

Official Results 

1976 in World Championship for Makes
1976 in British motorsport
6 Hours of Silverstone
April 1976 sports events in the United Kingdom